KAKC (1300 kHz) is a commercial AM radio station in Tulsa, Oklahoma. The station airs a conservative talk radio format and is owned by iHeartMedia, Inc.  The studios are on South Yale Avenue at the Tulsa Event Center in Southeast Tulsa.

By day, KAKC is powered at 5,000 watts.  But to protect other stations on 1300 AM from interference, at night it reduces power to 1,000 watts.  It uses a directional antenna with a three-tower array.  The transmitter site is off South 109th Avenue East in Bixby.

Programming
Much of the KAKC schedule is nationally syndicated talk shows.  Weekdays begin with America in the Morning followed by This Morning, America's First News with Gordon Deal, The Glenn Beck Program, The Clay Travis and Buck Sexton Show, The Charlie Kirk Show, The Jesse Kelly Show, The Joe Pags Show, Coast to Coast AM with George Noory and Red Eye Radio.  In afternoon drive time, Lee Matthews is carried from co-owned KTOK 1000 AM in Oklahoma City.

On weekends, syndicated shows include Our American Stories with Lee Habeeb, Armstrong & Getty, The Weekend with Michael Brown, Somewhere in Time with Art Bell, Gun Talk with Tom Gresham and Sunday Nights with Bill Cunningham.  Most hours begin with an update from Fox News Radio.

History

KOME
The original call sign was KOME. It broadcast at 1310 kilocycles and was powered at only 250 watts. It was a network affiliate of the Mutual Broadcasting System and was owned by the Oil Capital Sales Corporation. With the 1941 enactment of the North American Regional Broadcasting Agreement (NARBA), KOME moved to 1340 kHz.

The KAKC call letters were on 970 in Tulsa from the 1950s through 1980 during which time the station was owned by S. Carl Mark. It was the top rated station in Tulsa during many of those years despite having less transmitter power than its competitors.

KAKC
In 1985, 1300 AM picked up the KAKC call letters and flipped from a Middle of the Road and Adult Standards format to a satellite-based Oldies format. 1300 AM over the years has been a country music, R&B, album rock, adult contemporary, Regional Mexican, sports radio and business news station. The station has had little success in the Tulsa radio market due to a limited night signal. Former call letters for 1300 AM include KOME, KCNW, KXXO, and KMOD.

John Henry and Spencer Rhodes had a morning show that featured County and Western swing and early rock and roll. They featured many artists from the 1930s and the 1940s.  Two of the core artists were Hank Williams and Bob Wills.  The program often broadcast from the Cain's Ballroom in Tulsa. The show concentrated on the early years of Rock and Roll and had many of the original artists in studio who gave interviews and spoke of their own upbringings. These artists included the Shirelles, Chubby Checker, Chuck Berry, Hank Williams' backup musicians and driver of their tour bus, Roy Orbison, Bo Diddley who in an interview with Spencer Rhodes spoke of his days picking cotton as a child. There were other artists from the 1940s and 1950s who played the state fair circuits later in life and visited Tulsa.  They stopped by the studio and gave interviews to John Henry and Spencer Rhodes' early morning Country Swing and Rock and Roll show known as the "Hillbilly Hit Parade."

Sports and Talk
On April 16, 2007, KAKC changed its format to sports, with programming from ESPN Radio. In 2015, KAKC became the local network affiliate of CBS Sports Radio.  It was the Tulsa radio home for the Oklahoma City Thunder, the Tulsa Roughnecks FC and the Cleveland Browns Radio Network.

On September 15, 2021, KAKC changed its format from sports to conservative talk, branded as "1300 The Patriot". It began carrying many of the hosts from co-owned Premiere Networks, as well as shows from Westwood One and the Salem Radio Network.

Previous logo

References

External links
KAKC Website
Tulsa TV Memories site on KAKC 970

AKC
Radio stations established in 1938
1938 establishments in Oklahoma
IHeartMedia radio stations
Conservative talk radio
Talk radio stations in the United States